The 1970 South African Open was a combined men's and women's tennis tournament played on outdoor hard courts at Ellis Park in Johannesburg, South Africa. It was an independent tournament that was not part of either of the two main tennis circuits; the 1970 Pepsi-Cola Grand Prix circuit and the 1970 World Championship Tennis circuit. It was the 67th edition of the tournament and was held from 24 March through 4 April 1970. Owen Williams was the tournament director. Rod Laver and Margaret Court won the singles titles.

Finals

Men's singles
 Rod Laver defeated  Frew McMillan 4–6, 6–2, 6–1, 6–2

Women's singles
 Margaret Court defeated  Billie Jean King 6–4, 1–6, 6–3

Men's doubles
 Bob Hewitt /  Frew McMillan defeated  Cliff Drysdale /  Roger Taylor 6–3, 6–3, 6–2

Women's doubles
 Billie Jean King /  Rosie Casals defeated  Kerry Mellville /  Karen Krantzcke 6–2, 6–2

Mixed doubles
 Margaret Court /  Marty Riessen defeated  Pat Walkden /  Frew McMillan 7–5, 3–6, 7–5

References

South African Open (tennis)
1970 in South African tennis
South African Open (tennis)
Sports competitions in Johannesburg
March 1970 sports events in Africa
April 1970 sports events in Africa
1970s in Johannesburg